The Old Dominion Monarchs college football team represents Old Dominion University in the East Division of Conference USA (C-USA). The Monarchs compete as part of the National Collegiate Athletic Association (NCAA) Division I Football Bowl Subdivision. The program has had 2 head coaches, since it began play during the 1930 season; the Monarchs played from 1930-1940 and then disbanded, only to field a team over sixty years later in 2009.

Old Dominion has played 178 games over 19 seasons, appearing in 1 bowl game (December 23, 2016) and winning no national championships. They competed in the Division I Football Championship Subdivision from the team's reincarnation in 2009 to 2013, appearing in the playoffs twice and finishing the 2012 season ranked #6 in the FCS, their peak final ranking in school history. to the As of December 8, 2016, the team's overall record is 108–66–4. The team's 100th win came in the 2016 season opener against Hampton, which ODU won 54–21. The Monarchs reached the first bowl game in school history when they finished the 2016 regular season 9-3 and accepted a bid to play Eastern Michigan in the Bahamas Bowl.

Key

Coaches

Notes

References

Lists of college football head coaches
 
Virginia sports-related lists